Amir Or (אמיר אור) (born 1956), is an Israeli poet, novelist, and essayist whose works have been published in 45 languages.

He is the author of twelve volumes of poetry. His most recent books in Hebrew are The Madman's Prophecy (2012), Loot (selected poems 1977–2013) and Wings (2015). Or also published a fictional epic in metered prose, The Song of Tahira (2001) and the novel The Kingdom (2015) about the life of king David and contemporary society.

Biography
Amir Or was born in Tel Aviv. He has worked as a shepherd, builder and restaurateur. He studied philosophy and comparative religion at the Hebrew University in Jerusalem, where he later lectured on Ancient Greek Religion. Or has published essays on poetry, classics and comparative religion, and has taught creative writing in universities in Israel, Europe, USA and Japan.

Literary career
In 1990 Or founded "Helicon Poetry Society" in Israel and has been Editor-in-Chief of Helicon's journal and series of poetry books. In 1993 he set up the Arabic-Hebrew Helicon Poetry School and has founded and directed the Sha’ar International Poetry Festival. Or has also edited other literary journals and several anthologies of Hebrew verse in European languages. He serves as editor of the Catuv poetry books series, as national editor of the international poetry magazines Atlas and Blesok, and as a national coordinator for the U.N. sponsored UPC venture, “Poets for Peace.” He is a founding memberof the EACWP (European Association of Creative Writing Programs) of the international Circle of Poets and of the WPM (World Poetry Movement). Or gave readings and lectured in poetry festivals and conferences worldwide.

Awards and recognition

Or is the 2020 SPE Golden Wreath laureate. His other awards include the Levi Eshkol Prime Minister's Prize, the Hebrew University Harry Harshon prize, the Bernstein Prize, the Fulbright Award for writers, the 2010 Oeneumi literary prize of the Tetovo Poetry Festival, the 2013 Wine Poetry prize of the Struga Poetry Evenings, the 2014 Stefan Mirtov Ljubiša international literary award, the 2016 European Atlas of Lyrics award,  the 2017 BlueMet World Through Poetry award, the 2019 Homer European Medal of Poetry and Art, the 2020 ACUM Directorate prize, and the 2021 Wladislaw Reimont and Ianicius awards, Poland, "for his contribution to world poetry"; as well as Fellowships at the University of Iowa, the Jewish-Hebrew Centre of the University of Oxford,  the Heinrich Böll Foundation and the Literarische Colloquium, Berlin among others. For his translations he was awarded the 1995 Honorary Prize of the Israeli Minister of Culture and for his editorial work - the 2017 literary editing award of the Israeli Minister of Culture  .

Published works
Or published 13 poetry books, 2 novels, a book of essays and 11 books of his translations to Hebrew. His work was translated to more than 50 languages and published in 40 book in Europe, America and Asia.

Hebrew books
 Yeled (Child), Ha-kibbutz Ha-meuchad, 2018
 Al Ha-derekh (On The Road), Pardes, 2018
 Sikha (Discourse), Essays, Ha-kibbutz Ha-meuchad, 2018 
 HaMamlakha (The Kingdom), Novel, Ha-kibbutz Ha-meuchad, 2015 
 Knafayim (Wings), Ha-kibbutz Ha-meuchad, 2015
 Shalal (Loot) Selected poems 1977–2013, Ha-kibbutz Ha-meuchad, 2013
 Masa HaMeshuga (The Madman's Prophecy), Keshev, 2012
 HaHaya SheBalev (The Animal in the Heart). Keshev, 2010
 Muzeion Hazman (The Museum of Time). Ha-kibbutz Ha-meuchad, 2007
 Shir Tahira (The Song of Tahira). Novel, Xargol, 2001.
 Yom (Day). Ha-kibbutz Ha-meuchad & Tag, 1998.
 Shir (Poem). Ha-kibbutz Ha-meuchad, 1996.
 Kakha (So!). Ha-kibbutz Ha-meuchad, 1995.
 Pidyon ha-met. (Ransoming The Dead), Helicon-Bitan, 1994.
 Panim (Faces). Am Oved, 1991.
 Ani mabbit me-‛eyney ha-qofim (I Look Through The Monkeys’ Eyes). Eqed, 1987.

Books in translation
 Child, English, translated by Seth Michelson (Broken Sleep Books, 2023)
 Amir Or, Selected Poems, The Golden Wreath Book, Hebrew/English/Macedonian, translated to Macedonian by Zoran Ancevski (SPE, Struga 2021)
 Sand and Time, Persian, (Shen O Zaman), selected poems, translated by Rosa Jamali, (8 Publishing, Ahvaz 2021)
 The Museum of Time, Greek (To Mouseio Xronou), translated by Anastassis Vistonitis, (Bakxikon, Athens 2020)
 Wings, French (Ailes), translated by Michel Eckhart (maelstrÖm reEvolution, Brussels, 2020)
 Haiku Travelogue, French (Haiku du Bord du Chemin), translated by Benjamin Boulitrop (Aleph, Paris, 2020)
 The Right View (A paisagem correta) into Portuguese by Moacir Amancio (Relicário Edições, São Paulo, 2020)
 Language Says (Zaban Manshourist) into Persian by Rosa Jamali (Mehrodel Publication, Teheran, 2020) 
 Between Here and There (Entre ici et là), into French by Michel Eckhard Elial, (Éditions Érès, Toulouse,  2019)
 More (Selected Poems), into Georgian by Nika Jorjaneli, Nodar Dumbadze Publishers, Tbilisi,  2018
 Wings, into English by Seth Michelson, Sagging Meniscus, New York 2018
 Loot (Selectet Poems), English,  Dhauli Books, Bhubaneswar 2018
 Say and I'll be, into Serbian by Vida Ognjenović and David Albahari (Reci i Ja Ću Biti), Arhipelag, Belgrade 2017
Lessons, (Učne Ure) into Slovenian, (Beletrina libri, Ljubljana 2017) 		  			
Language Says – selected poems, (ЕЗИКЪТ КАЗВА) into Bulgarian by Antonia Apostolova and Robert Levy, (Da Publishers, Sofia 2017)
 The Museum of Time – selected poems, (时间博物馆) into Chinese, by Wang Hao (FLTRP, Beijing 2017)
 The Kingdom Part 1: The Runnaway, into English by Anthony Berris (Amazon 2017)
 Dédale (The Maze); into French, by Isabelle Dotan  (maelstrÖm reEvolution, Brussels 2016)
 Reci i Ja Ću Biti (Say And I'll Be); into Serbian, by Vida Ognjenović and David Albahari, (Kuća poezije, Banja Luka 2016)
 Krila (Wings)  into Serbian, by Vida Ognjenović,  (Arhipelag, Belgrade 2016)
 Dia>Logos; into English. Selected poems, (ArtAArk, Delhi/London/NY 2015)
 Muzei Vremena (The Museum of Time); into Serbian, by Vida Ognjenović and David Albahari,(Arhipelag, Belgrade 2015)
 Twarze (Faces); into Polish by Beata Tarnowska, (Z bliska, Goldap 2014)
 Tredici Poesie (Thirteen Poems); into Italian by Paolo Ruffilli, (The Writer publications, Milan 2014)
 Mucize ve Yağma (Miracle and Loot); into Turkish by Ulker Ince, (Şiirden Yayıncılık, Istanbul 2014)
 Să Te Vorbim Pe Tine (Let's Speak you); into Romanian by Ioana Ieronim, trilingual e-book with new translations, Romanian/English/Hebrew, (Contemporary Literature Press, The University of Bucharest, in conjunction with The British Council, Bucharest 2014) http://editura.mttlc.ro/carti/Amir%20Or.%20Let's%20Speak%20You.%20CLP.pdf
 Le Musée de Temps (The Museum of Time); into French by Aurélia Lassaque and Jacques Rancourt, (Editions de l'Amandier, Paris 2013) 
 Milagro (Miracle); into Spanish by Karla Coreas,(Sur Editores, Havana 2013)
 Der museum van de tijd (The Museum of Time); into Dutch by Peter Boreas, (Azul press, Maastricht, Amsterdam 2012)
 Pohara (Loot);into Serbian by David Albahari and Vida Ognjenović,(Arhipelag publishers, Belgrade 2012)
 Miracle/The Hours, Milagro/Las Horas; into Spanish by Karla Coreas, (Urpi Editores, NY 2011)
 Plates from the Museum of Time (ArtAark, New Delhi, New York, London 2009)
 Day — into English by Fiona Sampson, (Dedalus, Dublin, 2006)
 Wiersz (Poem); into Polish by Beata Tarnowska, (Portret, Olsztyn 2006)
 Să Te Vorbim Pe Tine (Let's Speak You); into Romanian by Ioana Ieronim, (Vinea Press, Buchaest 2006)
 Poem, into English by Helena Berg, (Dedalus, Dublin 2004, Romanian and Polish editions 2006)
 Language Says, English (Chattanooga, PM publications, Chattanooga, Tennessee, United States, 2001)
 Davej se, disam ziva voda (Drowning, He Breaths Living Water) — into Macedonian by Bogomil Gjuzel and Zoran Ancevski; (The Pleiades Series of Struga Poetry Festival, 2000)
 Miracle; English/Hebrew by Theo Dorgan, Tony Curtis and Mcdara Woods (Poetry Ireland, Dublin, 1998)
 As-sha‛ru Fattatu l-Mujrimin (Poetry is a Criminal Girl); into Arabic by Reuven Snir (Faradis publishers, Paris, 1995)

Or's translations into Hebrew
 The Gospel of Thomas (1992), 
 Limb-Loosening Desire (An Anthology of Erotic Greek Poetry 1993)
 Stories From The Mahabharata (1998)
 Lizard  by Banana Yoshimoto (1998, with Akiko Takahashi)
 To a Woman by Shuntaro Tanikawa (2000, with Akiko Takahashi)
 The Distance Between Us by Fiona Sampson (2008)
 The Song of The Salamander by Aurélia Lassaque (2014)
 Mara's Ghost by Anastassis Vistonitis (2016)
 Bitter Buckwheat by Jidi Madjia (2016)
 From The Hebrew Side - selected translations (2017)

See also
Hebrew literature
 The Modern Hebrew Poem Itself

References

External links
  AMIR OR SITE
  Poetry Life & Times Web site: "Israeli Poet Amir Or: A Conversation About Language, Myth, and the Soul" by Lynn Levin
  Article by Amir Or, "Hebrew Poetry in the New Millennium" at Israeli Ministry of Foreign Affairs Web site
  Article on Or's poetry by Ariel Hirschfeld, "On the connection between ‘I’ and ‘you’ and the development of the poet from one book to the next"
  Article on Or's poem, "A Glass of Beer", by Rami Saari, "I step into your shoes and become a part of you"

Poetry online
  "Shaharit (Morning Prayer)"
  "POEM" (translated from Hebrew by Helena Berg)
  "POEM" (long version; translated from Hebrew by Helena Berg)
  "The Barbarians (Round Two)" (translated by Vivian Eden)
  "Blue Job" (translated by Vivian Eden)
  "A Glass of Beer"
  "Epitaph" (translated by Vivian Eden)
  "I Look Through the Monkeys’ Eyes" (translated by Irit Sela)
  [untitled] (first line: "There's a speed in which things calm down.")

20th-century Israeli poets
Hebrew-language poets
Modern Hebrew writers
Living people
Bernstein Prize recipients
International Writing Program alumni
21st-century Israeli poets
Israeli male poets
20th-century male writers
21st-century male writers
1956 births